Desmond Oswald Oliver (26 October 1930 – 25 October 1997) was a New Zealand rugby union player and nephrologist.

Born in Palmerston North on 26 October 1930, Oliver was educated at Palmerston North Boys' High School, where he was a member of the school's 1st XV in 1948. He went on to study medicine at the University of Otago, graduating MB ChB in 1955.

A flanker, Oliver represented  and, briefly,  at a provincial level, and was a member of the New Zealand national side, the All Blacks, on their 1953–54 tour of Britain, Ireland, France and North America. On that tour, he played 20 games, scoring 12 points, for the All Blacks, and appeared in two Test matches.

Oliver became a house surgeon at Wellington Hospital in 1954. He moved to the University of Oxford in 1961, where he was a lecturer and became a leading researcher in renal medicine. He was active in the development of kidney transplant programmes and dialysis technology. Oliver died of cancer at his home in Horton-cum-Studley, near Oxford, on 25 October 1997.

References

1930 births
1997 deaths
Rugby union players from Palmerston North
People educated at Palmerston North Boys' High School
New Zealand rugby union players
New Zealand international rugby union players
Rugby union flankers
University of Otago alumni
New Zealand emigrants to England
New Zealand expatriates in England
Academics of the University of Oxford
New Zealand medical researchers
British nephrologists